Amari Spievey (born April 15, 1988) is a former American football safety. He played college football at Iowa. He was considered one of the top cornerback prospects for the 2010 NFL Draft. He was picked in the 3rd round (66th overall) in the 2010 NFL Draft. On August 31, 2013, he was released by the Lions.

High school career
Spievey attended Xavier High School, where he played cornerback and running back, and finished his career as the all-time leading rusher in school history. He rushed for 3,606 yards and 50 touchdowns in his career, along with 53 receptions for 858 yards and eight touchdowns.

On defense, Spievey made 87 career tackles and 16 interceptions, including two returned for touchdowns. He was a two-time coaches all-state selection and was named the Connecticut Player of the Year as a senior in 2005, the year the team won the Class LL state championship.

Regarded as a two-star recruit by Rivals.com, Spievey was listed as the #15 prospect from New England.

College career

Iowa Central Community College
Spievey redshirted his initial year at Iowa to preserve a year of eligibility. Spievey transferred to Iowa Central Community College after being academically ineligible for his sophomore season. There he recorded seven pass interceptions and 242 return yards. He returned two of those interceptions for touchdowns and also scored two touchdowns on kickoff returns and recorded four blocked punts. Iowa Central CC posted 9–2 overall record to earn a No. seven national ranking, and Spievey earned junior college all-American honors.

Iowa
In his redshirt sophomore season at Iowa, Spievey started all games at right cornerback and ranked third on the team with 68 tackles, including 43 solo tackles and 25 assists. He also had four pass interceptions and six pass break-ups. The Big Ten coaches named him Second-team All-Big Ten afterwards.  The following year, he was named to the First-team.

Professional career

2010 NFL Draft
By mid-season of 2009, Sports Illustrated's Tony Pauline listed Spievey as one of the "risers" for the 2010 NFL Draft. On January 11, 2010, Spievey announced that he would forgo his senior season and enter the NFL Draft. Spievey was selected by the Detroit Lions as the 2nd pick of the 3rd round (66th overall) of the 2010 NFL Draft.

Although he played cornerback in college, Spievey was moved to safety by the Lions to take advantage of his tackling ability and instincts.

Spievey opened the 2011 NFL season as a starter at safety for the Lions.

NFL statistics

Key
 GP: games played
 COMB: combined tackles
 TOTAL: total tackles
 AST: assisted tackles
 SACK: sacks
 FF: forced fumbles
 FR: fumble recoveries
 FR YDS: fumble return yards 
 INT: interceptions
 IR YDS: interception return yards
 AVG IR: average interception return
 LNG: longest interception return
 TD: interceptions returned for touchdown
 PD: passes defensed

References

External links
Official website
Iowa Hawkeyes bio

1988 births
Living people
Players of American football from Connecticut
American football cornerbacks
American football safeties
Iowa Hawkeyes football players
Detroit Lions players
Iowa Central Tritons football players
Sportspeople from Middletown, Connecticut